Balázs Taróczy became the 4-time consecutive champion after defeating Heinz Günthardt 6–3, 6–7, 6–4 in the final.

Seeds

Draw

Finals

Top half

Bottom half

References

External links
 Official results archive (ATP)
 Official results archive (ITF)

Dutch Open (tennis)
1981 Grand Prix (tennis)